A Yankee Princess is a 1919 American silent comedy-drama film produced and distributed by the Vitagraph Company of America. It was directed by David Smith and stars Bessie Love, who also wrote the screenplay. It is a lost film.

Plot 
Poor inventor Michael O'Reilly (Pearce) is an immigrant from Ireland living in the United States. When he suddenly comes into money, he sends his daughter Patsy (Love) is sent to an exclusive boarding school. The snobby students shun her until she claims to be an Irish princess, and they then demand to see her coat of arms. To meet this need, her father buys the family heirlooms of the destitute Irish Windbourne estate.

Lord Windbourne (Wetherby) himself appears and becomes engaged to Patsy, with the intention of reclaiming his treasures and her fortune. When she learns his true character, she breaks the engagement, but Windbourne threatens to reveal the O'Reillys' deception.

Handsome young Irishman Larry Burke (Gordon) appears with proof that he is the real Lord Windbourne. He proposes to Patsy, who accepts.

Cast 

 Bessie Love as Patsy O'Reilly
 Robert Gordon as Larry Burke
 George Pearce as Michael O'Reilly
 Aggie Herring as Mrs. O'Reilly
 J. Carlton Wetherby as Lord Windbourne
 Katherine Griffith as Lady Windbourne
 Lydia Yeamans Titus as Molly McGuire
 Max Asher as The French Chef

Reception 

The film received generally positive reviews, although the story was deemed predictable. It was commercially successful. The photography was highly praised, as was the acting, in particular that of Bessie Love.

References

External links 

 
 
 
 

1919 comedy-drama films
1919 lost films
1919 films
American black-and-white films
1910s English-language films
American silent feature films
Films based on short fiction
Films directed by David Smith (director)
Lost American films
Vitagraph Studios films
Lost comedy-drama films
1910s American films
Silent American comedy-drama films